Zhang Xueling (born 7 May 1983 in Beijing, China) is a Chinese-born Singaporean table tennis player.

Zhang started playing table tennis at the age of 6 and made her first International appearance in 1999. She won four gold medals at the 2005 Southeast Asian Games, helping Singapore to sweep the women events as well as the mixed doubles.

Zhang has defeated her higher-ranked fellow Singaporean, Li Jiawei, 3 times to date: once at the 2005 Southeast Asian Games in the women's singles finals; another at the 2006 Commonwealth Games in the mixed doubles finals partnered by Cai Xiaoli against Li and her teammate, Yang Zi; and in the women's singles finals in the same Games, winning four out of five gold medals for the country.

In the Athens Olympics 2004, she went to the Games with no other target than to perform at her best. Zhang Xueling played her game and surprised the nation when she defeated 14th seed, Korea's Lee Eun Sil and Japan's Ai Fujinuma, to secure a position in the quarter-finals, before losing to Korea's Kim Hyang Mi.

However, Zhang has resigned in February, and has returned to Shanghai to join her husband, Zheng Qi. Zheng Qi was the Ex-Assistant Table Tennis Coach for the Singapore's Men's Team. Zhang's departure was due to Wang Yuegu, another Chinese-born Table Tennis Player, who has just received her Singaporean citizenship in February 2007.

Achievements

1998
Golden Racket (VIE)
Gold - Women's Doubles
2001
21st SEA Games
Gold - Women's Team
2002
17th Commonwealth Games
Gold - Women's Team
Bronze - Women's Doubles
South East Asian Championships 2002
Gold - Women's Team
Gold Women's Singles
Silver - Mixed Doubles
14th Asian Games
Bronze - Women's Team
2003
Southeast Asian Games
Silver - Women's Doubles (partner: Tan Paey Fern)
Gold - Women's Team
Silver - Women's Singles
Asian Championships
Bronze - Women's Team
2004
Olympic Games
Top 8 - Women's Singles
South East Asian Championships
Gold - Women's Team
Silver - Women's Doubles (partner: Tan Paey Fern)
2005
ITTF Pro Tour Korea Open
Gold - Women's Doubles (partner: Tan Paey Fern)
ITTF Pro Tour China Open
Silver - Women's Doubles (partner: Tan Paey Fern)
Singapore Sports Meritorious Senior Award
SEA Games
Gold - Women's Team
Gold - Women's Singles
Gold - Women's Doubles (partner: Li Jia Wei)
Gold - Mixed Doubles (partner: Yang Zi)
2006
18th Commonwealth Games
Gold - Women's Team
Gold - Women's Singles
Gold - Women's Doubles (partner: Li Jia Wei)
Gold - Mixed Doubles (partner: Yang Zi)
South East Asian Championships 2006
Gold - Women's Team
Gold - Women's Singles
Gold - Women's Doubles (partner: Tan Paey Fern)
Gold - Mixed Doubles (partner: Yang Zi)
15th Asian Games
Silver - Women's Team

References

External links
 

1983 births
Living people
Table tennis players from Beijing
Chinese emigrants to Singapore
Singaporean sportspeople of Chinese descent
Naturalised citizens of Singapore
Naturalised table tennis players
Chinese female table tennis players
Singaporean female table tennis players
Commonwealth Games gold medallists for Singapore
Table tennis players at the 2006 Commonwealth Games
Olympic table tennis players of Singapore
Table tennis players at the 2004 Summer Olympics
Asian Games medalists in table tennis
Table tennis players at the 2002 Asian Games
Table tennis players at the 2006 Asian Games
Commonwealth Games medallists in table tennis
Medalists at the 2002 Asian Games
Medalists at the 2006 Asian Games
Asian Games silver medalists for Singapore
Asian Games bronze medalists for Singapore
Southeast Asian Games medalists in table tennis
Southeast Asian Games gold medalists for Singapore
Southeast Asian Games silver medalists for Singapore
Competitors at the 2001 Southeast Asian Games
Competitors at the 2003 Southeast Asian Games
Competitors at the 2005 Southeast Asian Games
Medallists at the 2002 Commonwealth Games
Medallists at the 2006 Commonwealth Games